The Sukhvinder Singh Sukhu ministry is the state cabinet of Himachal Pradesh headed by present chief minister Sukhvinder Singh Sukhu of Himachal Pradesh. The oath taking ceremony of Sukhu was held in Shimla on 11 December 2022. Cabinet ministers will be selected soon.

History

Inauguration 
On 8 December 2022, election results for the Himachal Pradesh Legislative Assembly were announced. The state continued its tradition of unseating the incumbent government, with the Indian National Congress obtaining a decisive victory winning 40 seats of the 68 in the hill state.

On 10 December 2022, the Congress party chose Sukhvinder Singh Sukhu to become the chief minister of Himachal Pradesh. He was sworn in as the CM of his state the day later, with Mukesh Agnihotri becoming deputy chief minister.

Council of Ministers 

|}

References 

Government of Himachal Pradesh